Premasoothram is a 2018 Indian Malayalam-language romantic comedy film written and directed by Jiju Asokan, based on the short story Jalajeevitham by Asokan Charuvil. The story is set in the period 1980-1990s. The film stars Chemban Vinod Jose, Balu Varghese, Dharmajan Bolgatty, Indrans, Sudheer Karamana and Lijomol Jose. The film was released in Kerala on 11 May 2018. The movie is about a student played by Balu Varghese in one way love with his own classmate played by Lijomol Jose. His antics in trying to woo her is the crux of the whole movie.

Cast
 Chemban Vinod Jose as VKP/Visham Kudicha Pankajakshan
 Balu Varghese as Prakashan
 Lijomol Jose as Ammukutty
 Sudheer Karamana as Manoharan
Vettukili Prakash as Subramaniyan
 Indrans as Kochubaby
 Dharmajan Bolgatty
 Manju Sunichen as Sarasu 
 Anumol as Manjurani
 Sinoj Varghese as Rajappan
 Sreejith Ravi as Keshava Karuvan
 Chethan Jayalal
 Sibi Thomas as Bhasurachandran
 Anjali Nair as Sugandhi Teacher
  Reshmi Anil as The woman carrying the baby
 Sasankan Mayyanad as Suni
 Vishnu Govindhan  as Sukumaran
 Vijilesh Karayad as Pandan Paramu
Preetha Pradeep as Mallika

Production
The film is based on the short story Jalajeevitham from the collection of short stories by Asokan Charuvil. The romantic comedy is set in the period 1980-1990s.

Release
The film was released in Kerala on 11 May 2018.

References

External links
 

2018 films
Indian romantic comedy films
2010s Malayalam-language films
2018 romantic comedy films